The 2006 IBSF World Grand Prix was an amateur snooker tournament that took place from 22 February to 6 March 2006 in Prestatyn, Wales  It was the 31st edition of the IBSF World Snooker Championship and also doubled as a qualification event for the World Snooker Tour.

The 2005 IBSF World Snooker Championship was originally due to be held in Pakistan. However, due to the Kashmir earthquake the tournament was cancelled. As a result, a new tournament was organised to be held in Prestatyn, Wales in 2006 under the name IBSF World Grand Prix so as not to cause confusion between with the 2006 IBSF World Snooker Championship due to be held in Amman, Jordan later that year, with the winner of the World Grand Prix qualifying for the vacant place on World Snooker Tour 2006/07 season.

The tournament was won by 14-year old Michael White who defeated 24th seed Mark Boyle 11–5 in the final, in doing so White became the youngest winner in the tournaments history. Despite being the runner-up Boyle was awarded with World Tour qualification place due to White's age at the time. White would go on to join the World Snooker Tour for the 2007/08 season after winning the European Under-19 Championship. He would cement his reputation as one of the most promising upcoming snooker talents in the world at the time by reaching the top 16 in 2015 and winning his first ranking title at the Indian Open.

Results

References

2006 in snooker
Snooker amateur tournaments
Prestatyn
2006 in Welsh sport
International sports competitions hosted by Wales